Don't Forget Your Roots may refer to:

 "Don't Forget Your Roots" (song), a 2011 song by Six60
 Don't Forget Your Roots (album), a 2011 album by H2O